The following is a list of aircraft accidents and incidents which have resulted in fatalities on the ground. Aircraft crashes with a high number of ground fatalities typically occur in areas where there are large congregations of people, such as buildings, marketplaces, and sporting events.

The crashes of American Airlines Flight 11 and United Airlines Flight 175 into the World Trade Center as part of the September 11 attacks are by far the deadliest incidents of this sort, with a total of 2,606 ground fatalities attributed to the two crashes and subsequent collapse of 1 WTC and 2 WTC. The deadliest accidental crash of an aircraft was the 1996 Air Africa crash, which resulted in the deaths of at least 225 people on the ground.

Table key

Table

See also

 Aviation accidents and incidents
 Index of aviation articles
 List of accidents and incidents involving commercial aircraft
 List of accidents and incidents involving general aviation
 Lists of accidents and incidents involving military aircraft
 List of civil aviation authorities
 List of deadliest aircraft accidents and incidents

Notes

References

External links
Plane Crash Database
ASN Aviation Safety Database

Accidents by ground fatalities
Ground fatalities
Aircraft